Ananta Saha (born 12 September 1996) is an Indian cricketer. He made his List A debut on 6 October 2019, for Railways in the 2019–20 Vijay Hazare Trophy. He made his Twenty20 debut on 5 November 2021, for Railways in the 2021–22 Syed Mushtaq Ali Trophy.

References

External links
 

1996 births
Living people
Indian cricketers
Railways cricketers
Place of birth missing (living people)